Georgia has a long history of establishing protected areas dating back to 1912 when the Lagodekhi Strict Nature Reserve was created. Nowadays, protected areas make up to 7% of the country's territory (384 684 ha) and about 75% of protected areas are covered by forests.
Total number of protected areas in Georgia — 89. In Georgia there are 14 Strict Nature Reserves, 12 National Parks, 20 Managed Nature Reserves, 40 Natural Monuments, 2 Ramsar sites and 1 Protected Landscape. 
Management and coordination of the Protected Areas is implemented by a Legal Entity of Public Law Protected Areas Agency of the Ministry of Environment Protection and Natural Resources of Georgia.
Currently under development:
Trialeti Planned National Park

National parks

See also 
 Environmental issues in Georgia
 List of protected areas of Georgia

References

 
Protected areas established in 1965
Georgia (country) geography-related lists